Linor Goralik (born Yuliya Borisovna Goralik,  on 9 July 1975, Dnipropetrovsk, Ukrainian SSR) is a Russian-speaking author, poet, artist and essayist.

Biography 

She was born on 9 July 1975 in a Jewish family in Dnipropetrovsk, in the Ukrainian SSR of the Soviet Union (now Dnipro in Ukraine). From 1982 to 1986 she studied at school #67, and from 1987 to 1989 at school #23. Since 1989 she has been residing in Israel where she studied computer science from 1991 to 1994 at Ben-Gurion University of the Negev in Beersheba.

Since the early 2000s she has been working in Moscow as an author, journalist and marketing analyst. She has also translated works of Etgar Keret and Vytautas Pliura (with Stanislav Lvovsky) and organized several art exhibitions and projects.

After the 2014 annexation of Crimea she left Russia for Israel and travelled between the two countries until November 2021. She is a vocal opponent to Vladimir Putin's regime and to the 2022 Russian invasion of Ukraine.

Anti-homophobia activist 

In February 2013 she recorded an address to support the Russian LGBT community.

Works 

 The Book of Quotations, "Цитатник" (poems, 1999)
 Outsiders, "Не местные" (2003)
 The Tale About The Northern Lights, "Сказка о северном сиянии" (with Yuriy Sorochkin) (2003)
 The Tale About  Fairy Metal, "Сказка о волшебном металле". (with Yuriy Sorochkin) (2004)
 No (alternative English title - PG-21), "Нет" (novel, with Sergey Kuznetsov, 2004)
 Half the Sky, "Половина неба" (novel, with Stanislav Lvovsky)
 Speaks, "Говорит" (2004)
 Meals not for Kids, "Недетская еда" (2004)
 The Book of Lonelinesses, "Книга одиночеств" (2004, with Max Frei)
 A Hollow Woman. Barbie's World Inside and Outside, "Полая женщина. Мир Барби: изнутри и снаружи" (2005)
 Martin Isn't Crying, "Мартин не плачет" (fable, 2007)
 Pull the Hook Hard, Petrusha, "Подсекай, Петруша" (poems, 2007)
 Meals not for Kids. Without Desserts, "Недетская еда. Без сладкого" (2007)
 The Hare Named FML, "Заяц ПЦ" (comics, 2007)
 The Hare Named FML 2.0, "Заяц ПЦ 2.0" (comics, 2008)
 In Short, "Короче" (flash fiction, 2008)
 Agatha Goes Home, "Агата возвращается домой" (fable, 2008)
 The Hare Named FML 3.0, "Заяц ПЦ 3.0" (comics, 2008), reissue (2011)
 Valery, "Валерий" (novelette, 2011)
 The Folklore of the Sector M1 Inhabitants, "Устное народное творчество обитателей сектора М1" (flash fiction and poems, 2011)
 The Bible Zoo, "Библейский зоопарк". Серия "Чейсовская коллекция" (М.: Текст, 2012)
 A Guide to Israel (only and exclusively) for Kids, "Путеводитель по Израилю (только и исключительно) для детей" (M.: Текст, 2013)
 Private Persons. Biographies of Poets Told by Themselves, "Частные лица. Биографии поэтов, рассказанные ими самими" (M.: Новое литературное обозрение, 2013)
 So It Was A Whistle, "Так это был гудочек" (poems, Ozolnieki: Literature Without Borders, 2015)
 Found Life: Poems, Stories, Comics, a Play, and an Interview (Columbia University Press, 2017). Edited by Ainsley Morse, Maria Vassileva, and Maya Vinokour. )
 Agatha Looks Up, "Агата смотрит вверх" (М.: Livebook, 2017)
 The Vespers Beast, "Всенощная зверь" (poems, Ozolnieki: Literature Without Borders, 2019)
 A Guide to Israel, "Путеводитель по Израилю" (М., 2019)
 The 203 Stories About The Dresses, "203 истории про платья" (with Maria Voul) (М., 2019)
 The Cold Water of Venisana, "Холодная вода Венисаны" (young adult fantasy, M.: Livebook, 2019); second edition, 2021
 All Capable Breathing The Breath, Все, Способные дышать дыхание (М.: АСТ, 2019)
 Martin Isn't Crying, "Мартин не плачет" (fable with illustrations by author, М., 2021).
 The Double Bridges of Venisana, "Двойные мосты Венисаны" (М.: Livebook, 2021).
 The Secret Passages of Venisana, "Тайные ходы Венисаны" (М.: Livebook, 2021)
 Named After That One, "Имени такого-то" 15 (М.: Новое литературное обозрение, 2022 ) 
 The Black Fire of Venisana, "Черный огонь Венисаны" (М.: Livebook, 2022)

References

External links 

 Linor Goralik's official site
 A few very short stories in English
 Linor Goralik at Babylon site
 Bibliography of English translations

1975 births
21st-century essayists
21st-century Russian poets
21st-century Russian women writers
Living people
Writers from Dnipro
Russian activists against the 2022 Russian invasion of Ukraine
Russian women essayists
Russian women poets